Fernando Salinas (born 18 May 1960) is a Bolivian footballer. He played in twelve matches for the Bolivia national football team from 1983 to 1989. He was also part of Bolivia's squad for the 1983 Copa América tournament.

References

External links
 

1960 births
Living people
Bolivian footballers
Bolivia international footballers
Association football forwards
People from Tarija
Club Real Potosí managers
Club San José managers
La Paz F.C. managers